Gualete is a town in the Puerto Plata province of the Dominican Republic.

References 

 World-Gazetteer.com

Populated places in Puerto Plata Province